Terence Michael Elkan Barnet Etherton, Baron Etherton,  (born 21 June 1951) is a British retired judge and member of the House of Lords. He was the Master of the Rolls and Head of Civil Justice from 2016 to 2021 and Chancellor of the High Court from 2013 to 2016.

Early life
Etherton attended Holmewood House School and St Paul's School, and studied history and law at Corpus Christi College, Cambridge. He was a member of the British fencing team (sabre) from 1977 to 1980 and was selected to compete at the 1980 Summer Olympics in Moscow, but joined the boycott in protest against the 1979 Soviet invasion of Afghanistan.

Legal career
Etherton was called to the bar (Gray's Inn) in 1974 and became a Queen's Counsel in 1990. He was appointed a High Court judge on 11 January 2001 and assigned to the Chancery Division, receiving the customary knighthood. In August 2006, he was appointed Chairman of the Law Commission, the statutory independent body created by the Law Commissions Act 1965 to keep the law under review and to recommend reform where needed.

On 29 September 2008, on expansion of the Court of Appeal from 37 to 38 judges, Etherton was appointed as a Lord Justice of Appeal. He was sworn in on 29 September 2008, and received the customary appointment to the Privy Council. On 11 January 2013, he was appointed Chancellor of the High Court.

On 3 October 2016, Etherton succeeded Lord Dyson as Master of the Rolls.

In October 2016 Etherton was one of the three judges forming the divisional court of the High Court in proceedings concerning the use of the royal prerogative for the issue of notification in accordance with Article 50 of the Treaty on European Union (the Lisbon Treaty) (Santos and Miller, Applicants -v- Secretary of State for Exiting the European Union, Respondent). His role in this judgment meant that he appeared in an infamous front-cover of the Daily Mail (Enemies of the People), and in a move which was widely seen as attacking his homosexuality, the Mail Online chastised Etherton for being an "openly-gay ex-Olympic fencer". The reference was swiftly removed, though without apology.
 
In June 2019, Etherton, Sir Stephen Irwin and Sir Rabinder Singh found that ministers had breached British law when they "made no concluded assessments of whether the Saudi-led coalition had committed violations of international humanitarian law in the past, during the Yemen conflict, and made no attempt to do so."

Affiliations

Non-Executive Director Riverside Mental Health Trust (1992-1999), Chairman of Broadmoor Hospital (1999-2001) and Chairman of West London Mental Health NHS Trust (2000-2001).

Installed as an honorary fellow of Royal Holloway College, University of London (2005)

Honorary fellow since 2007 of Corpus Christi College, Cambridge.

President of the Nicholas Bacon Society, Corpus Christi's law society, from 2001 to 2013.

In January 2009 he was awarded an honorary doctorate in law by City University, London.

President of the Council of the four Inns of Court (COIC) for a three-year term (2009-2012).

Honorary Professor at the University of Kent since 2011. In 2018, he was awarded an honorary doctorate in law by the University of Kent.

Honorary President of the Property Bar Association and the Chairman of The Trust Law Committee (2012 - 2021).

Visiting professor of law at Birkbeck, University of London since 2010 and lectured on subjects including diversity in the judiciary and equity and trusts on the Birkbeck, University of London LLB and LLM Qualifying Law Degrees. He is also Patron of the Birkbeck Law Review.

Senior Warden at West London Synagogue. (3-year appointment, 2013 - 2016).

Chairman of the Civil Justice Council (2016- 2021).

Chairman of the Advisory Council on the National Archives and Records (2016-2021).

Honorary Member of the Society of Legal Scholars (2017).

Honorary Fellowship of Birkbeck, University of London (4 November 2019-)

In September 2021 he was awarded an honorary doctorate in law by the University of Plymouth.

In November 2022 he was awarded an honorary doctorate of laws by the University of Law.

Personal life
Etherton entered a civil partnership in 2006. On his appointment as Lord Justice of Appeal in 2008, he said, "My appointment also shows that diversity in sexuality is not a bar to preferment up to the highest levels of the judiciary".

On 10 December 2014, pursuant to legislation allowing couples in civil partnerships to convert the relationship to marriage, Etherton and his civil partner Andrew Stone were married in a Reform Judaism wedding ceremony at West London Synagogue.

In December 2020, it was announced that Etherton would be created a crossbench life peer in the 2020 Political Peerages. On 23 December 2020, he was created Baron Etherton, of Marylebone in the City of Westminster.

Notes and references

1951 births
Living people
People educated at Holmewood House School
People educated at St Paul's School, London
Alumni of Corpus Christi College, Cambridge
British male sabre fencers
Chancery Division judges
Crossbench life peers
Fellows of Corpus Christi College, Cambridge
Gay sportsmen
Knights Bachelor
LGBT Jews
LGBT judges
LGBT life peers
Lords Justices of Appeal
Masters of the Rolls
Members of Gray's Inn
Members of the Privy Council of the United Kingdom
English LGBT sportspeople
LGBT fencers
Jewish male sabre fencers
Life peers created by Elizabeth II